East Timor sent a delegation to compete at the 2008 Summer Paralympics in Beijing, China. However, official records give no indication that more than one East Timorese athlete (16-year-old powerlifter Lily Costa Silva) eventually entered competition. Costa Silva was also listed as the country's flagbearer for both the opening and the closing ceremonies.

Powerlifting

See also
East Timor at the Paralympics
East Timor at the 2008 Summer Olympics

References

External links
Beijing 2008 Paralympic Games Official Site
International Paralympic Committee

Nations at the 2008 Summer Paralympics
2008
Paralympics